Jacqueline Kouwenhoven is a member of parliament for Rumphi West in Malawi. Kouwenhoven's tenure began on 2014-05-20.

She was born in the Netherlands but arrived in Africa in 1983, working in healthcare in Cameroon and Mali before setting in Malawi in 2000.

References

Living people
Members of the National Assembly (Malawi)
21st-century Malawian politicians
21st-century women politicians
Democratic Progressive Party (Malawi) politicians
Year of birth missing (living people)